Araucaria is a genus of coniferous trees.

Araucaria nay also refer to:
Araucaria (crossword compiler), pseudonym of the crossword compiler John Galbraith Graham (1921–2013)
Araucaria (software), argument mapping software
Araucária, a city and municipality in Paraná state, Brazil